teamLab Planets TOKYO DMM.com is an art facility that utilizes digital technology and was established by teamLab and DMM.com. It is located in 6-chome, Toyosu, Koto-ku, Tokyo.

Overview 
"DMM.Planets Art by teamLab" held in Odaiba in 2016 has been scaled up and will open in Shin-Toyosu from July 7, 2018 until the end of 2020. It is composed of a total of eight artworks by teamLab, centered on four huge work spaces. By immersing the entire body with other people in these massive “Body Immersive” artworks, the boundary between the body and the artwork dissolves, the boundaries between the self, others, and the world become something continuous, and we explore a new relationship without boundaries between ourselves and the world.

In the third year since its opening, the "Garden Area" was newly established on July 2, 2021 with the addition of two large garden works. The area consists of a garden filled with countless orchids blooming in the air and a moss garden with brilliant egg-shaped sculptures. By adding this work to the existing "Water Area", teamLab Planets has been renewed into "a museum that enters water and a garden that integrates with flowers" with a total of nine works.

Customers enter the museum barefoot to experience the artworks, as there are areas in which the customer will enter water. At the time of opening, it was scheduled to be operating until the fall of 2020, but has since been extended until the end of 2022 and again until the end of 2023.

Artwork 
 Waterfall of Light Particles at the Top of an Incline
 Soft Black Hole - Your Body Becomes a Space that Influences Another Body
 The Infinite Crystal Universe
 Drawing on the Water Surface Created by the Dance of Koi and People -Infinity
 Cold Life
 Expanding Three-Dimensional Existence in Transforming Space - Flattening 3 Colors and 9 Blurred Colors, Free Floating
 Floating in the Falling Universe of Flowers
 Universe of Water Particles Falling from the Sky
Floating Flower Garden: Flowers and I are of the Same Root, the Garden and I are One
Moss Garden of Resonating Microcosms - Solidified Light Color, Sunrise and Sunset

History 
 July 7, 2018: Opened in Toyosu, Tokyo for a limited time until the end of 2020. 
 December 20, 2018: Changed some artworks to a winter version. Started a collaboration menu with a Toyosu Fish Market related businesses.
 March 15, 2019: Start of limited-time version where you can see cherry blossoms in some artworks.
 July 7, 2019: On the 1st anniversary of opening, began a limited-time version where sunflowers can be seen in some of the artworks.
 August 29, 2019: Started a limited-time version where you can see autumn leaves and chrysanthemums in some artworks.
August 8, 2019: One year since its opening in July, 2018, the museum has welcomed over 1.25 million visitors from 106 countries and regions around the world.
 February 16, 2020: Two artworks of cherry blossom art will be released for a limited time.
 June 1, 2020: The museum, after being temporarily closed to prevent the spread of the novel coronavirus in Japan and overseas, announced it would resume operation from June 5, 2020 restricting the number of visitors.
 July 16, 2020: In two years of operation, 1.8 million people visited the museum. A new work "Universe of Water Particles Falling from the Sky" was released. The museum will extend operations until the end of 2022.
July 2, 2021: A new area consisting of two garden works opens in three years from the opening
September 1st, 2022: The museum will extend operations until the end of 2023.

External links

Reference 

Art museums and galleries in Tokyo
Buildings and structures in Koto, Tokyo
Art museums established in 2018
2018 establishments in Japan